John Mann (1869 – 1 January 1939) was an Australian politician. He was the member for Cairns in the Legislative Assembly of Queensland from 1904 to 1912. Initially a member of the Labor Party, he followed Premier William Kidston out of the party in 1907 into what became known as the "Kidston Party".

Mann died in Cairns in 1939 and was buried in the Martyn St Cemetery.

References

1869 births
1939 deaths
Members of the Queensland Legislative Assembly
Place of birth missing
Australian Labor Party members of the Parliament of Queensland